Sejiro Avoseh (born 1990) is a visual artist from Nigeria who resides in Canterbury, England. A painter best known for his signature fusion of abstracted human figures and automobile parts using painting and collaging techniques, Sejiro makes his painted montages from cut-out magazines and newspapers. Sejiro's works are autobiographical, lending critical voices on the poor fate of the indigent underclass in his society, and on the highhandedness and abuse of power by public servants and elected officials. In 2018, he was featured in the Financial Times as one of Nigeria's promising artists.

Education 
Sejiro holds a Higher National Diploma in Creative Arts from Lagos State Polytechnic in Lagos, Nigeria; and a Masters in Fine Art at the University for the Creative Arts, Canterbury, Kent, England.

Solo exhibitions 
"Abuse of Innocence". Angels and Muse, Lagos, Nigeria. September 2020.

"When We Are Not What We Are". RELE Gallery, Lagos, Nigeria. July 2018.

Group exhibitions, art fairs, auctions and workshops 
"Stir crazy" Kravets Wehby Gallery, New York, USA. January 2023.

"RESISTE" (with Salifou Lindou). Afikaris Gallery, Paris, France. February 2021.

FNB Art Jobourg Art Fair. Johannesburg, South Africa. November 2020.

Dubai Art Fair. Dubai, UAE. March 2020.

Young Contemporaries Alumni Exhibition. National Museum, Lagos. January 2020.

FNB Art Jobourg Art Fair. Johannesburg, South Africa. October 2019.

"Back to Base - Young Contemporaries Art Workshop for Students" in Badagry. Goethe Institut, Lagos, Nigeria. 2019.

ArtX Lagos, West Africa International Art Fair. Lagos, Nigeria. 2017.

Annual Art Auction. Eccles Community Art Center, Utah, U.S. March 2017.

Affordable Art Auction. Art House Contemporary, Lagos, Nigeria. February 2017

Young Contemporaries Exhibition. RELE Art Foundation, Lagos, Nigeria. January 2017.

Art Auction. Art Gallery of Burlington, Canada. June 2016.

References 

Nigerian contemporary artists
Living people
1990 births
Artists from Lagos
Lagos State Polytechnic alumni